Juice is a drink made from the extraction or pressing of the natural liquid contained in fruit and vegetables.

Juice or The Juice may also refer to:

People
 Juice (American rapper), American rapper Terry Parker
 Juice Wrld (1998–2019), American rapper Jarad Higgins
 Juice (Serbian rapper) (born Ivan Ivanović in 1981), also known as "Đus"
 Le'Veon Bell (born 1992), American football player, stage name "Juice" as a musician
 Kevin Bieksa (born 1981), Canadian hockey player
 Kristian Huselius (born 1978), Swedish hockey player
 Jussi Jokinen (born 1983), Finnish hockey player
 Oran "Juice" Jones (born 1957), American soul and R&B singer and actor
 Jarvis Landry (born 1992), American football player
 Juice Leskinen (1950–2006), Finnish singer-songwriter
 Juice Newton (born 1952), American pop music and country singer
 Juuse Saros (born 1995), Finnish hockey goaltender
 O. J. Simpson (born 1947), American football player nicknamed "the Juice"
 Juice Williams (born 1987), American football player
 Juice Robinson (born 1989), ring name of American professional wrestler Joseph Robinson

Arts, entertainment, and media

Music

Groups
Juice (American band), an American band from Boston College
Juice (Australian band), an Australian underground funk metal band
Juice (Danish group), a Danish R&B musical group
Juice (trio), a British a cappella voice trio

Albums
Juice (The Grapes album), 1997
Juice (Juice Newton album), 1981
Juice (Oran "Juice" Jones album), 1986
 Juice (Medeski Scofield Martin & Wood album), 2014
Juice (soundtrack), the soundtrack to the 1992 crime drama film, Juice
 J.U.I.C.E. (EP), by Atlanta rapper Roscoe Dash

Songs
"Juice" (B'z song), 2000
"Juice" (Chance the Rapper song), 2013
"Juice" (Headless Chickens song), 1992
"Juice" (Lizzo song), 2019
"Juice" (Yo Gotti song), 2017
"Juice", 2018 song by Bhad Bhabie featuring YG
"Juice", a song by Qveen Herby from her 2021 album A Woman
"Juice", a song by Steve Vai from his 1995 EP Alien Love Secrets

Periodicals
Juice (Australian magazine), defunct Australian music magazine
Juice (German magazine), a German hip hop magazine
Juice (skateboarding magazine)

Television
Juice, a pop music program presented by Magenta Devine
Juice TV, a New Zealand music television channel

Other uses in arts, entertainment, and media
Juice (1992 film), an American crime drama thriller
Juice (2017 film), an Indian short
Juice! (2012), a novel by Ishmael Reed
Juice Ortiz, a fictional character in the FX television series Sons of Anarchy

Science and technology
Juice (aggregator), a cross-platform aggregator used to download podcasts
Juice (JVM), a Java ME Java Virtual Machine
JUICE (software), software for editing and analysing phytosociological data
Jupiter Icy Moons Explorer (JUICE), a planned spacecraft of the European Space Agency
Pancreatic juice, in biology, a fluid produced by the pancreas

Slang
Alcoholic drink 
Anabolic steroids
E-liquid, a liquid that produces the vapor of an electronic cigarette
Electric current or electrical power
Vigorish, the commission charged by bookmakers

See also
Juice=Juice, a Japanese girl group
Guice, a dependency injection framework for Java
Joose, a flavored malt beverage
JUCE, a free application framework used for the development of GUI applications and plug-ins
Juicy (disambiguation)

Lists of people by nickname